Papyrus is a Belgian comic book series, written and illustrated by Lucien De Gieter. The story takes place in Ancient Egypt. It was first published in 1974 in Spirou magazine in the form of episodes.

An animated series was created in 1998 that was two seasons long (52 episodes) and shown on TFOU TV in France and in Quebec on Radio-Canada. It is airing in 2016 on Unis.

In 2000 a video game was made for Game Boy developed by Dupuis and published by Ubisoft.

Plot
In the beginning, Horus the falcon god of light and Set the god of evil fought to control Egypt. The council of the Gods decided, Set was sent to exile and Horus became the first pharaoh of Egypt. For two thousand years, pharaoh succeeded pharaoh. But Set had plotted his revenge, and deep inside his sinister black Pyramid of Ombos, Set imprisoned Horus in a magic sarcophagus. From then on, and no longer protected by the god Horus, Egypt was at the mercy of Set and his servant Aker. So the gods chose Papyrus, a young fisherman who must find the secret entrance to Ombos, free the god Horus and restore peace to Egypt.

Characters

Main characters
Papyrus: originally a young fisherman, Papyrus is the hero of the comic, friend of the daughter of the Pharaoh, and possessor of a magic sword which was given to him by the daughter of the god Sobek; in exchange, he must protect the princess Théti-Chéri from all danger.
Théti-Chéri: daughter of the pharaoh Merenptah, grand priestess of Isis, sacred dancer, and heiress to the throne of the Double Kingdom. While she can be haughty and stubborn, she cares very much for Papyrus.

Regular side characters
The Goddess with the Resplendent Hair (La Déesse au Cheveux Resplendissant): Papyrus' patron deity, a lesser goddess and daughter of Sobek.
Imhotep: a one-legged boy and apprentice to the architect Amenope who becomes a friend of Papyrus.
Pouin: a short, timid Bedouine dwarf.
Khamelot: Pouin's donkey, who is much smarter and more determined than his master.
Shepti: A young maidservant to Théti-Chéri who becomes a pawn of Sekhmet's mad High Priest in issue 22 (La Prisonnière de Sekhmet). Upon her rescue by Papyrus and Pouin, she and Pouin fall in love and get married.
Phoetus: a small mummy.

Albums
Thirty-three albums have been published so far:
La Momie engloutie (et ). Papyrus is appointed by Sobek's daughter to rescue Théti-Chéri and her father from a power-hungry traitor at the Pharaoh's side.
Le Maître des trois portes. While trying to discover why the Nile's waters have suddenly gone low, Papyrus and Théti-Chéri discover and become prisoners in a golden underground city rules by the living mummy of Menes, who wishes to seize power over Egypt again. In order to escape, Papyrus must discover the secret of the three gates which separate the city from the upper world.
Le Colosse sans visage. Papyrus aids the inhabitants of a city cursed by the gods for the unholy atrocities their past ruler (the titular colossus) has committed. For this well-meant deed, he is cursed by the gods and transformed into a hideous creature, and it is up to Théti-Chéri to appease the gods - even if it means paying the ultimate price.
Le Tombeau de Pharaon
L'Égyptien blanc
Les Quatre Doigts du Dieu Lune
La Vengeance des Ramsès; English translation: The Rameses Revenge. The four colossi of the Temple of Rameses rise against a band of plunderers.
La Métamorphose d'Imhotep; English translation: Imhotep's Transformation: Papyrus must find an antidote for the poisoned Pharaoh while a friend plays the role of the ruler.
Les Larmes du géant: A Hittite princess arrives at court as a second wife for the Pharaoh, bringing with her the secret of iron. In the temple of Amonhotep III, plotters want to seize power for themselves and build invincible weapons, so they capture the Hittite princess as well as Théti.
La Pyramide noire: Papyrus takes an enchanted Théti to a mage who may be able to heal her.
Le Pharaon maudit(): Théti and Papyrus fight against plunderers, six girls who call themselves Daughters of Akhenaton.
L'Obélisque: Amenope, the royal architect, and his assistant Imhotep, despite obstacles but with the help of Papyrus and Théti cut, transport, and erect an obelisk at Thebes.
Le Labyrinthe: Papyrus is named ambassador of Egypt by the King of Minos.
L'Île Cyclope: Théti goes to rejoin Papyrus in Crete with the mummy of the son of Minos. Papyrus sets off again, finally finding and rescuing the princess on a fantastic island.
L'Enfant hiéroglyphe: Imhotep, the successor of Amenope, is saved from a fire by Papyrus. The parchment that established the plans of Amenope for the new temple were saved. But the workers strike, and Imhotep is accused of sacrilege. Théti and Papyrus discover those responsible for the strike.
Le Seigneur des crocodiles: Captured by Libyan nomads, Papyrus and Théti escape into the desert where they meet a blind mage who asks Papyrus to give him his eyes.
Toutânkhamon, le Pharaon assassiné; English translation Tutankhamun(): While beset and framed by graverobbers plundering the Valley of the Kings, Papyrus meets the spirit of Ankhesenpaaton, the wife of Tutankhamen, who seeks his help in reuniting her with her beloved husband, just as Papyrus' ancestor has done so many years ago.
L'Œil de Rê: During the feast of Opet, Amenmes, one of the sons of Rameses II disputes the throne of the Pharaoh Merenptah.
Les Momies maléfiques; English translation The Evil Mummies: In the chambers of the temple of Montouhotep, ten bodies of archers of Seqenenre Taa II, dead in combat, are mummified in haste. Meanwhile, Théti's expedition enters the desert but forgets to render homage to Seth.
La Colère du grand sphinx ( et ); English translation: While searching for Théti, Papyrus angers the Great Sphinx.
Le Talisman de la grande pyramide: Wanting to discover the origin of the screams heard at the foot of the Great Pyramid each night, Papyrus angers the god Anubis.
La Prisonnière de Sekhmet; English translation Sekhmet's Captive (ISBN|978-1800440395)): The goddess Sekhmet is upset: the ancient Great Priest of her temple has conceived a diabolical plan in which Princess Théti, the only one capable of calming this divinity, plays a central role.
Le Cheval de Troie: Papyrus and Théti arrive in Troy, ruined and occupied by thieves searching in vain for the treasure of King Priam.
La main pourpre: Papyrus and Théti find the "purple hand" in Tyre, along with victims of the leaders of the city.
Le Pharaon fou: After having escaped from the soldiers of Tyre, Papyrus and Théti find that Pouin has become the king of Dor. After having convinced him to return to Egypt, Papyrus meets a curious character named Moses who is leaving Egypt with his tribe.
Le Masque d'Horus: The queen sends Papyrus on a secret mission: to find Théti's younger brother, who was taken by the priests of the temple of Kom Ombo.
La Fureur des Dieux: Rameses II the younger hunts a bull in the company of his father, Sethi I.
Les Enfants d'Isis: For his services to Egypt, Papyrus is granted land and an estate, but the Pharao has a darker, ulterior motive for his generosity. He means to separate Papyrus and Théti, who have come to love each other, so that he can arrange a more prestigious marriage of his daughter with a prince of Mitanni.
L'Île de la reine morte
L'Oracle
L'Or de Pharaon
Le taureau de Montou
Papyrus Pharaon

Translations

English
Since November 2007, Cinebook Ltd has been publishing Papyrus in English. Seven albums have so far been released:

The Rameses Revenge, November 2007, . (translation of the 7th volume)
Imhotep's Transformation, April 2008,  (translation of the 8th volume)
Tutankhamun, April 2009,  (translation of the 17th volume)
The Evil Mummies, April 2010,  (translation of the 19th volume) 
The Anger of the Great Sphinx, June 2012,   (translation of the 20th volume)
The Amulet of the Great Pyramid, June 2015,  (translation of the 21st volume)
Sekhmet's Captive, March 2022,  (translation of the 22nd volume)

Spanish
Dolmen Editorial published a Spanish volume July 2021 called "Papyrus 1984-1986."

Animated series

Season 1
The Black Mummy
Anger of the Moon God
Lord of the Crocodiles
Revenge of Ramses
The Faceless Giant
The Cursed Pharaoh
The Black Sun of Seth
The Metamorphosis of Imhotep
The Maze
The Triumph of Bastet
City of Scribes
The Demon of the Red Mountains
The Golden Feather of the Great Falcon
The Return of the Red Sphinx
The White Egyptian
The Harp of Hathor
The Forgotten Sarcophagus
The House of Life
The Revenge of Amon
The Rebirth of the Child Pharaoh
Tears of Giants
The Hieroglyph Child
The Master of the Three Doors
The Black Pyramid
The Mirror of Nebou
The Second Flood of the Sacred River

Season 2
The Sacrilege of Papyrus
Mika the Sorceress
The Thirtieth Case of Senet Cursed
Justice Thoueris
The Awakening of Osiris
White Baboon
Stolen Country
Four Chapels of Tutankhamun
The Divine Potter
Return Senkhet
The Talisman of the Great Pyramid
Yam
Time of Discord
Seven Knots of Horus
Renunciation of Papyrus
Nile Red
The Sacred Crown of Wadjet
Neferure

Emissaries
Princess Tiya
Princess Star
The Sacred Child of Ebla
The Ished Tree
The Djed Pillar
The Trial of Papyrus
The Nightmare

Canadian animator and cartoonist Guy Delisle documented his experiences while working on this animated series in 1997 in Shenzhen: A Travelogue from China.

References

External links

Official site at Dupuis

Official site of the Papyrus animation
English publisher of Papyrus - Cinebook Ltd

Belgian comic strips
Dupuis titles
Bandes dessinées
Alternate history comics
1974 comics debuts
Adventure comics
Comics characters introduced in 1974
Fictional ancient Egyptians
Fictional fishers
Comics set in ancient Egypt
Egyptian mythology in comics
Belgian comics characters
Comics adapted into animated series
Comics adapted into television series
Comics adapted into video games
Television series based on Belgian comics
Television series based on Egyptian mythology
Belgian children's animated action television series
Belgian children's animated adventure television series
Belgian children's animated fantasy television series
Canadian children's animated action television series
Canadian children's animated adventure television series
Canadian children's animated fantasy television series
French children's animated action television series
French children's animated adventure television series
French children's animated fantasy television series
1990s Belgian television series
1990s Canadian animated television series
1990s French animated television series
1998 Belgian television series debuts
1998 Canadian television series debuts
1998 French television series debuts